Bemmeridae is a family of African and Asian mygalomorph spiders that was first described as the tribe Bemmereae by Eugène Simon in 1903. It was elevated to a subfamily of funnel-web trapdoor spiders (Bemmerinae) in 1985, then to its own family in 2020.

Genera
, the World Spider Catalog accepts the following genera:
Atmetochilus Simon, 1887
Damarchus Thorell, 1891 – India, Malaysia, Indonesia, Singapore
Homostola Simon, 1892 – South Africa
Spiroctenus Simon, 1889 – South Africa

References

 
Mygalomorphae families